United States ex rel. Toth v. Quarles, 350 U.S. 11 (1955), was a decision by the Supreme Court of the United States that expanded the rights of citizens to civilian trials, holding that an ex-serviceman cannot be court-martialed for crimes alleged during his military service.

The United States Air Force alleged that the petitioner, Robert W. Toth, committed a murder while he was on active duty in Korea. (On Sept  27, 1952 while on guard duty at a air base in South Korea, Toth and airman Thomas Kinder had taken into custody a drunken South Korean Civilian named Bang Soon Kil who had grabbed at Toth arm who then pistol-whipped the Civilian. Toth and Kinder were ordered by their superior Lt George Schreiber to kill Bang. Schreiber and Kinder then still in the military were court-martialed: Schreiber was sentenced to life in prison (reduced to 5 years in prison; forfeiture of pay and dishonorable discharge-he served 20 months before being dismissed from service); Kinder was sentenced to life sentence (reduced to two years in prison and a dishonorable discharge; the discharge was later suspended, allowing him to return to service).They argued that while they knew about the murder while Toth was in the armed forces, they didn't know the identity of the man who did it so Toth was honorably discharged. Donald A. Quarles, at the time the Secretary of the Air Force, argued that as the crimes occurred during Toth's military service, the military could constitutionally try him.

The case mostly dealt with the Uniform Code of Military Justice (UCMJ), a 1950 law passed by the 81st United States Congress and signed by President Harry S. Truman, and whether or not certain provisions of it were constitutional; that is to say, whether or not Congress could deprive ex-service members of their Fourth and Fifth Amendment rights.

In the majority opinion, decided 6–3, Justice Hugo Black wrote that "[the UCMJ] is not a valid exercise of the power granted Congress in Article I of the Constitution." The decision in Quarles would prove as an important precedent which the Court would rely on two years later in the landmark Reid v. Covert ruling. Whereas Quarles dealt with the case of an ex-servicemember, Covert would deny the government the ability to try any US citizen by military tribunal, even citizens abroad. This important precedent was re-affirmed in Hamdi v. Rumsfeld (2004), where the Court ruled that while the US government may detain enemy combatants abroad, those detained must have "the ability to challenge their enemy combatant status before an impartial authority" for the detention to be constitutional.

Those who dissented gave various reasons. While Justice Sherman Minton agreed that civilians "not under the jurisdiction of the Military Code" have a right to a civilian trial, he argued that the Court had erred because Toth was not a "full-fledged civilian". Justice Stanley F. Reed on the other hand, argued that the solution to the question should have come from Congress amending the UCMJ and not via a Court order.

As regards Toth, civilian authorities would never retry him; a 1989 article in the Military Law Review declares: "Toth literally got away with murder."

See also 
 Kinsella v. Krueger

References

External links
 

United States Supreme Court cases
United States Supreme Court cases of the Warren Court
1955 in United States case law
United States military case law